The 2012–2013 season was the 17th edition of the Lebanese Basketball League. The regular season began on Friday, November 2, 2012 and ended on Monday March 4, 2013. The playoffs began on Thursday, March 7 and ended in the Semifinals on Sunday May 26, 2013, after the League got cancelled.

Teams

Preseason

SuperCup 
Champville SC, winners of the Lebanese Basketball League 2011-2012 defeated Anibal Zahle, winners of the Lebanese Basketball Cup to win The SuperCup.

Regular season

Standings

Final 8

Standings

Playoffs

Statistics Leaders

Awards 
 Player of the Year: Andre Emmett, Amchit Club
 Guard of the Year: Jasmon Youngblood, Byblos Club
 Forward of the Year: Andre Emmett, Amchit Club
 Center of the Year: Michael Fraser, Byblos Club
 Newcomer of the Year: Julian Khazzouh, Sagesse Beirut
 Import of the Year: Andre Emmett, Amchit Club
 Domestic Player of the Year: Fadi El Khatib, Champville SC
 Defensive Player of the Year: Loren Woods, Riyadi Beirut
 Coach of the Year:
 First Team:
 G: Jasmon Youngblood, Byblos Club
 F; Andre Emmett, Amchit Club
 F: Fadi El Khatib, Champville SC
 F: Julian Khazzouh, Sagesse Beirut
 F/C: Michael Fraser, Byblos Club
 Second Team:
 PG: Rodrigue Akl, Sagesse Beirut
 G: Eric Chatfield, Mouttahed Tripoli
 F/G: Jean AbdelNour, Riyadi Beirut
 F/C: Bassel Bawji, Mouttahed Tripoli
 C: DeShawn Sims, Sagesse Beirut

References
 http://www.asia-basket.com/Lebanon/basketball-Division-A_2012-2013.asp
 http://www.foxsportspulse.com/comp_info.cgi?c=11-9326-0-241509-0&a=STATS

Lebanese Basketball League seasons
League
Lebanese